Astartea astarteoides is a shrub endemic to Western Australia.

It blooms between October and November producing white-pink flowers.

It is found along the south coast in wet swampy depressions and road verges in the Goldfields-Esperance region of Western Australia where it grows in sandy-loamy-clay soils over laterite or granite.

References

Eudicots of Western Australia
astarteoides
Endemic flora of Western Australia
Plants described in 1867
Taxa named by Barbara Lynette Rye